Bischofszell Stadt railway station is a railway station in Bischofszell, in the Swiss canton of Thurgau. It is an intermediate stop on the Sulgen–Gossau line.

Services 
Bischofszell Stadt is served by the S5 of the St. Gallen S-Bahn:

References

External links 
 
 

Railway stations in the canton of Thurgau
Swiss Federal Railways stations